Archimedes was launched at Sunderland in 1796 or 1797. She traded between England and the Baltic until the British government chartered her as a transport c.1809. She was lost in December 1811 while coming back from the Baltic.

Career
Archimedes first appeared in Lloyd's Register (LR) in 1797 with J.Hill, master and owner, and trade Liverpool–London. She then traded between England and the Baltic.

Lloyd's List (LL) reported on 1 June 1798 that Archimedes, Howard, master, had been taken while sailing from Haambro to Petersburg. However, Lloyd's List showed Archimedes, Howard, master, in Elsinor in mid-July and Memel in early August. 

Archimedes was a unique name in Lloyd's Register so the vessel taken and reappearing may be the same Archimedes as the one of this article; she disappeared from Lloyd's Register between and 1803. In a process that is currently unclear Archimedes returned to British ownership. She reappeared in the Register of Shipping in 1800, the first year in which the Register published, even though she did not reappear in Lloyd's Register until 1803.

Loss
The Register of Shipping (RS) for 1812 showed Archimedes with Haley, master, Corsbie, owner, and trade London transport. The entry carries the annotation "LOST".

On 24–25 December 1811 a tremendous storm destroyed several vessels of an English convoy coming back to England from the Baltic. , under captain James Newman-Newman, was wrecked on the Haak Sands at the mouth of the Texel with the loss of all but 12 of her crew. Ten of the transports of Heros convoy were also lost. One of them was Archimedes, whose crew, however, was saved. The other escort for the transports,  ended up trapped near the Helder and had to surrender to the Dutch. The number of men saved on Archimedes and Grasshopper was reported as 114, most of whom would have been from Grasshopper. Three of the other transports lost were Flora, Centurion, and Rosina. Part of Floras crew, like that of Archimedes, was saved. The master and 17 men from Rosina were lost, as was the entire crew of Centurion.

Citations

References

1790s ships
Ships built in England
Age of Sail merchant ships of England
Captured ships
Maritime incidents in 1811
Shipwrecks in the North Sea